Maharajkumar of Vizianagram (known as "Vizzy") created an international team including Jack Hobbs and Herbert Sutcliffe to tour India and Ceylon from November 1930 to January 1931 and played a series of matches against leading or regional Indian and Ceylonese teams with nine of the games rated first-class by most cricket sources (see also Variations in published cricket statistics). "Vizzy" captained the team himself. Besides Hobbs and Sutcliffe, the team included future Indian Test players C. K. Nayudu and Syed Mushtaq Ali.

References

External links

1930 in Indian cricket
1930 in Ceylon
1931 in Indian cricket
Indian cricket tours of Sri Lanka
International cricket competitions from 1918–19 to 1945
Indian cricket seasons from 1918–19 to 1944–45
Sri Lankan cricket seasons from 1880–81 to 1971–72
Multi-national cricket tours of India
Multi-national cricket tours of Sri Lanka